The Patiala Ki Rao is a seasonal stream that originates in Shivalik Hills, Punjab, enters Chandigarh then to Mohali and later merges into the Ghaggar River. The stream runs across Fateh Burj at Chappar Chiri. It is one of the seasonal rivulets amongst others in Chandigarh, which include Sukhna Choe in the East and N Choe  in the West.

Pollution 
UT panel raises Patiala Ki Rao pollution with Punjab due to a significant increase in Nayagaon's population. On 31 July 2010, Punjab Pollution Control Board reported that effluents discharged in N-Choe from Chandigarh were beyond the permissible limit. The analysis revealed that pollution levels such as BOD-150 mg/1 and COD 320 mg/1 was found to be more than the permissible limit of 30 mg/1 and 250 mg/1, respectively. Mohali residents complained that the N-choe was not properly protected and that sewage was found in the water.

References

Mohali
Landforms of Chandigarh
Rivers of India
Rivers of Himachal Pradesh